Rugby union in Kazakhstan is a fairly popular sport. As of May 2018, they are ranked 61st by World Rugby, and as of June 2009, they had 2335 registered players and twenty clubs.

Governing body
The national body is the Kazakhstan Rugby Union.

History

Soviet Period
Rugby union was played in the Russian Empire as early as in 1908. In 1934 the Moscow Championship was started, and in 1936 the first Soviet Championship took place.

In 1949, rugby union was forbidden in the USSR during the "fight against the cosmopolitanism". The competitions were resumed in 1957, and the Soviet Championship in 1966. In 1975 the Soviet national team played their first match.

Kazakhstan had its own rugby team in the USSR, but it was not treated as a proper national side.

The SKA from Alma-Ata was a quite successful club in the Soviet era, finishing 3rd et 2nd respectively of the 1988 and 1991 championships, and also winning the Soviet Cup in 1988.

Post-independence
Kazakhstan is arguably the most successful ex-Soviet rugby nation aside from Georgia and Russia (who have both qualified for the Rugby World Cup).

The Kazakhstan women's national rugby union team played their first international against Germany in 1993, which they lost by one point, 11-10. The female team also takes part in the ARFU Women's Rugby Championship.

Rugby continues to be moderately popular. The Japan-Kazakhstan Asian Five Nations game in Almaty Central Stadium, Almaty was attended by 6,000 people.
 This was unfortunately also their worst loss, 82-6.

See also 
 Kazakhstan national rugby union team 
 Kazakhstan women's national rugby union team
 Kazakhstan national rugby union team (sevens)

References

External links
 Official site
 IRB Kazakhstan page 
 Asian Rugby Football Union 
 Rugby in Asia Kazakhstan page
 Kazakh eyes are smiling (Daily Telegraph)
 "Islam and Rugby" on the Rugby Readers review
 Tries and Tribulations
 Luke O'Callaghan's Blog about Kazakhstan Rugby